The macaroni penguin (Eudyptes chrysolophus) is a species of penguin found from the Subantarctic to the Antarctic Peninsula. One of six species of crested penguin, it is very closely related to the royal penguin, and some authorities consider the two to be a single species. It bears a distinctive yellow crest, and the face and upperparts are black and sharply delineated from the white underparts. The male and female are similar in appearance; the male is slightly larger and stronger with a relatively larger bill. Like all penguins, it is flightless, with a streamlined body and wings stiffened and flattened into flippers for a marine lifestyle.

Its diet consists of a variety of crustaceans, mainly krill, as well as small fish and cephalopods; the species consumes more marine life annually than any other species of seabird. These birds moult once a year, spending about three to four weeks ashore, before returning to the sea. Numbering up to 100,000 individuals, the breeding colonies of the macaroni penguin are among the largest and densest of all penguin species. With about 18 million individuals, the macaroni penguin is the most numerous penguin species. Widespread declines in populations have been recorded since the mid-1970s and their conservation status is classified as vulnerable.

Taxonomy
The macaroni penguin was described from the Falkland Islands in 1837 by German naturalist Johann Friedrich von Brandt. It is one of six or so species in the genus Eudyptes, collectively known as crested penguins. The genus name is derived from the Ancient Greek words eu "good", and dyptes "diver". The specific name chrysolophus is derived from the Greek words chryse "golden", and lophos "crest".

The common name was recorded from the early 19th century in the Falkland Islands. English sailors apparently named the species for its conspicuous yellow crest. It is similar to the then fashionable Macaroni.

Molecular clock evidence using DNA suggests the macaroni penguin diverged from its closest relative, the royal penguin (Eudyptes schlegeli), around 1.5 million years ago. The two have generally been considered different species, but the close similarities of their DNA sequences has led some, such as Australian ornithologists Les Christidis and Walter Boles, to treat the royal penguin as a subspecies of the macaroni penguin. The two species are very similar in appearance; the royal penguin has a white face instead of the usually black face of the macaroni penguin. Interbreeding with the Indo-Pacific subspecies of the southern rockhopper penguin (E. chrysocome filholi) has been reported at Heard and Marion Islands, with three hybrid subspecies recorded there by a 1987–88 Australian National Antarctic Research Expedition.

Description

The macaroni penguin is a large, crested penguin, similar in appearance to other members of the genus Eudyptes. Males average from  after incubating, or  after moult to  before moult, while females average  after to  before moult. Among standard measurements, the thick bill (from the gape) measures , the culmen being around a centimetre less. The head, chin, throat, and upper parts are black and sharply demarcated against the white under parts. The black plumage has a bluish sheen when new and brownish when old. The most striking feature is the yellow crest that arises from a patch on the centre of the forehead, and extends horizontally backwards to the nape. The flippers are blue-black on the upper surface with a white trailing edge, and mainly white underneath with a black tip and leading edge. The large, bulbous bill is orange-brown. The iris is red and a patch of pinkish bare skin is found from the base of the bill to the eye. The legs and feet are pink. The male and female are similar in appearance; males tend to be slightly larger.

Immature birds are distinguished by their smaller size, smaller, duller-brown bill, dark grey chin and throat, and absent or underdeveloped head plumes, often just a scattering of yellow feathers. The crest is fully developed in birds aged three to four years, a year or two before breeding age.

Macaroni penguins moult once a year, a process in which they replace all of their old feathers. They spend around two weeks accumulating fat before moulting because they do not feed during the moult, as they cannot enter the water to forage for food without feathers. The process typically takes three to four weeks, which they spend sitting ashore. Once finished, they go back to sea and return to their colonies to mate in the spring. Overall survival rates are poorly known; the successful return of breeding adults at South Georgia Island varied between 49% and 78% over three years, and around 10% of those that did return did not breed the following year.

Distribution and habitat

A 1993 review estimated that the macaroni was the most abundant species of penguin, with a minimum of 11,841,600 pairs worldwide. Macaroni penguins range from the Subantarctic to the Antarctic Peninsula; at least 216 breeding colonies at 50 sites have been recorded. In South America, macaroni penguins are found in southern Chile, the Falkland Islands, South Georgia and the South Sandwich Islands, and South Orkney Islands. They also occupy much of Antarctica and the Antarctic Peninsula, including the northern South Shetland Islands, Bouvet Island, the Prince Edward and Marion islands, the Crozet Islands, the Kerguelen Islands, and the Heard and McDonald Islands. While foraging for food, groups will range north to the islands off Australia, New Zealand, southern Brazil, Tristan da Cunha, and South Africa.

Ecology

Feeding 
The diet of the macaroni penguin consists of a variety of crustaceans, squid and fish; the proportions that each makes up vary with locality and season. Krill, particularly Antarctic krill (Euphausia superba), account for over 90% of food during breeding season. Cephalopods and small fish such as the marbled rockcod (Notothenia rossii), painted notie (Lepidonotothen larseni), Champsocephalus gunneri, the lanternfish species Krefftichthys anderssoni, Protomyctophum tenisoni and P. normani become more important during chick-rearing. Like several other penguin species, the macaroni penguin sometimes deliberately swallows small (10– to 30-mm-diameter) stones; this behaviour has been speculated to aid in providing ballast for deep-sea diving, or to help grind food, especially the exoskeletons of crustaceans which are a significant part of its diet.

Foraging for food is generally conducted on a daily basis, from dawn to dusk when they have chicks to feed. Overnight trips are sometimes made, especially as the chicks grow older; a 2008 study that used surgically implanted data loggers to track the movement of the birds showed the foraging trips become longer once the chick-rearing period is over. Birds venture out for 10–20 days during incubation and before the moult. Macaroni penguins are known to be the largest single consumer of marine resources among all of the seabirds, with an estimated take of 9.2 million tonnes of krill a year. Outside the breeding season, macaroni penguins tend to dive deeper, longer, and more efficiently during their winter migration than during the summer breeding season. Year round, foraging dives usually occur during daylight hours, but winter dives are more constrained by daylight due to the shorter days.

Some night foraging does occur, but these dives are much shallower, ranging from only  in depth. Dives rarely exceed two minutes in duration. All dives are V-shaped, and no time is spent at the sea bottom; about half the time on a foraging trip is spent diving. Birds have been calculated as catching from 4 to 16 krill or 40 to 50 amphipods per dive.

Predators
The macaroni penguin's predators consist of birds and aquatic mammals. The leopard seal (Hydrurga leptonyx), Antarctic fur seal (Arctocephalus gazella), Subantarctic fur seal (A. tropicalis), and killer whale (Orcinus orca)  hunt adult macaroni penguins in the water. Macaroni colonies suffer comparatively low rates of predation if undisturbed; predators generally only take eggs and chicks that have been left unattended or abandoned. Skua species, the snowy sheathbill (Chionis alba), and kelp gull (Larus dominicanus) prey on eggs, and skuas and giant petrels also take chicks and sick or injured adult birds.

Life history

Like most other penguin species, the macaroni penguin is a social animal in its nesting and its foraging behaviour; its breeding colonies are among the largest and most densely populated. Scientist Charles Andre Bost found that macaroni penguins nesting at Kerguelen dispersed eastwards over an area exceeding 3×106 km2. Fitted with geolocation sensors, the 12 penguins studied travelled over  during the six- to seven-month study period and spent their time largely within a zone 47–49°S and 70–110°E in the central Indian Ocean, not coming ashore once. This area, known as the Polar Frontal Zone, was notable for the absence of krill.

Living in colonies results in a high level of social interaction between birds, which has led to a large repertoire of visual, as well as vocal, displays. These behaviours peak early in the breeding period, and colonies particularly quieten when the male macaroni penguins are at sea. Agonistic displays are those which are intended to confront or drive off or, alternatively, appease and avoid conflict with other individuals. Macaroni penguins, particularly those on adjacent nests, may engage in 'bill-jousting'; birds lock bills and wrestle, each trying to unseat the other, as well as batter with flippers and peck or strike its opponent's nape. Submissive displays include the 'slender walk', where birds move through the colony with feathers flattened, flippers moved to the front of the body, and head and neck hunched, and general hunching of head and neck when incubating or standing at the nest.

Courtship and breeding

Female macaroni penguins can begin breeding at around five years of age, while the males do not normally breed until at least six years old. Females breed at a younger age because the male population is larger. The surplus of male penguins allows the female penguins to select more experienced male partners as soon as the females are physically able to breed. Commencing a few days after females arrive at the colony, sexual displays are used by males to attract partners and advertise their territory, and by pairs once together at the nest site and at changeover of incubation shifts. In the 'ecstatic display', a penguin bows forward, making loud throbbing sounds, and then extends its head and neck up until its neck and beak are vertical. The bird then waves its head from side to side, braying loudly. Birds also engage in mutual bowing, trumpeting, and preening. Monitoring of pair fidelity at South Georgia has shown around three-quarters of pairs will breed together again the following year.

Adult macaroni penguins typically begin to breed late in October, and lay their eggs in early November. The nest itself is a shallow scrape in the ground which may be lined with some pebbles, stones, or grass, or nestled in a clump of tussock grass (on South Georgia Island). Nests are densely packed, ranging from around 66 cm apart in the middle of a colony to 86 cm at the edges. A fertile macaroni penguin will lay two eggs each breeding season. The first egg to be laid weighs , 61–64% the size of the  second, and is extremely unlikely to survive. The two eggs together weigh 4.8% of the mother's body weight; the composition of an egg is 20% yolk, 66% albumen, and 14% shell. Like those of other penguin species, the shell is relatively thick to minimise risk of breakage, and the yolk is large, which is associated with chicks born in an advanced stage of development. Some of the yolk remains at hatching and is consumed by the chick in its first few days.

The fate of the first egg is mostly unknown, but studies on the related royal penguin and erect-crested penguin show the female tips the egg out when the larger second egg is laid. The task of incubating the egg is divided into three roughly equal sessions of around 12 days each over a five-week period. The first session is shared by both parents, followed by the male returning to sea, leaving the female alone to tend the egg. Upon the male's return, the female goes off to sea and does not return until the chick has hatched. Both sexes fast for a considerable period during breeding; the male fasts for 37 days after arrival until he returns to sea for around 10 days before fasting while incubating eggs and young for another 36 days, and the female fasts for 42 days from her arrival after the male until late in the incubation period. Both adults lose 36–40% of their body weight during this period. The second egg hatches around 34 days after it is laid. Macaroni penguins typically leave their breeding colony by April or May to disperse into the ocean.

From the moment the egg is hatched, the male macaroni penguin cares for the newly hatched chick. For about 23 to 25 days, the male protects its offspring and helps to keep it warm, since only a few of its feathers have grown in by this time. The female brings food to the chick every one to two days. When they are not being protected by the adult male penguins, the chicks form crèches to keep warm and stay protected. Once their adult feathers have grown in at about 60 to 70 days, they are ready to go out to sea on their own.

Conservation
The population of macaroni penguins is estimated at around 18 million mature individuals; a substantial decline has been recorded in several locations. This includes a 50% reduction in the South Georgia population between the mid-1970s to mid-1990s, and the disappearance of the species from Isla Recalada in Southern Chile. This decline of the overall population in the last 30 years has resulted in the classification of the species as globally Vulnerable by the IUCN Red List of Threatened Species. Long-term monitoring programs are underway at a number of breeding colonies, and many of the islands that support breeding populations of this penguin are protected reserves. The Heard Islands and McDonald Islands are World Heritage Sites for the macaroni penguin. The macaroni penguin may be being impacted by commercial fishing and marine pollution. A 2008 study suggests the abilities of female penguins to reproduce may be negatively affected by climate- and fishing-induced reductions in krill density.

References

Cited text

External links

 Macaroni penguins – Center for Biological Diversity
 The Penguin Project at Washington University
 The Penguin Page

macaroni penguin
Birds of Patagonia
Birds of Antarctica
Birds of subantarctic islands
Birds of islands of the Atlantic Ocean
Fauna of Heard Island and McDonald Islands
Fauna of the Crozet Islands
Birds of the Indian Ocean
Fauna of the Prince Edward Islands
Vulnerable fauna of Australia
macaroni penguin
Macaroni